Michael Page Carnes (1950) is an American composer of contemporary classical music.

Life and career
Carnes was born in North Carolina. The son of a piano teacher, he received his first formal musical training on trumpet in the public schools. He formed and played in several rock bands beginning in the late 1960s.  While originally a performer of popular music and jazz, Carnes became interested in classical music and resumed his education.  

He studied composition under John Bavicchi at Berklee College of Music where he received his BA in 1977, John Thow and Theodore Antoniou at Boston University where he received his Masters in Music in 1980 and later with Rudi Martinus van Dijk and Gunther Schuller.  His early works were largely tonal and reflective of jazz.  These include a number of guitar etudes.  In the years that followed, his music became more strongly chromatic, without an obvious tonal center.  Principal works from this period include Fantasy Music 1 (for flute and taped electronic sounds), Fantasy Music 2 (for harpsichord and taped electronic sounds), and Marimba Concerto.   

An intermediate period included Brass Quintet #2, War Songs (for voice and taped electronic sounds), and Variations (computer). More recently, his style has moved into a more flexible variant of the 12-tone technique. Recent works include Brass Quintet #3, Symphony: Challenger and Proper Motion (trio for flute, clarinet, piano) which had its world premiere at the Park City and Salt Lake City International Music Festival in 2005.

During his years in Boston, Carnes was a member of the "Composers in Red Sneakers" collective. In 1985, the group inaugurated the 8th season of contemporary music at New York's Symphony Space. Amongst the pieces on the program were two songs for mezzo-soprano and marimba by Carnes set to texts by e.e. cummings with Nancy Zeltsman on the marimba.

Recordings
Fantasy Music 1 is included on the 1984 Northeastern Records LP, Composers in Red Sneakers.

References

Sources
Blotner, Linda Solow, "Michael Page Carnes", The Boston composers project: a bibliography of contemporary music, MIT Press, 1983. 
Cleary, David, "The Boston New-Music Scene: Present and Recent Past, with Special Emphasis on Composers in Red Sneakers", 21st Century Music, June 2000, Volume 7, Number 6 
Holland, Bernard, "Review: Composers in Red Sneakers", New York Times, 13 October 1985
Page, Tim, "Numic Notes; Moderns in Red Sneakers", New York Times, 6 October 1985.
Reichel, Edward, "Music Fest Features Trio's Premiere", Deseret News, 21 August 2005 (subscription access)
Philadelphia Inquirer, "Bostonians Make Their Own Album", 23 June 1985, (subscription access)

External links
Official website
Composers in Red Sneakers Archives
Fantasy Music 1 played on Music from New England, New Sounds, WYNC, 1 June 1987

1950 births
Living people
People from McDowell County, North Carolina